
Gmina Ostrowite is a rural gmina (administrative district) in Słupca County, Greater Poland Voivodeship, in west-central Poland.

Villages
Gmina Ostrowite contains the villages and settlements of Doły, Giewartów, Giewartów-Holendry, Gostuń, Grabina, Izdebno, Jarotki, Kania, Kąpiel, Kosewo, Lipnica, Mieczownica, Naprusewo, Ostrowite, Przecław, Sienno, Siernicze Małe, Siernicze Wielkie, Skrzynka Mała, Stara Olszyna, Świnna, Szyszłowo, Tomaszewo and Tomiszewo.

Neighbouring gminas
Gmina Ostrowite is bordered by the gminas of Kazimierz Biskupi, Kleczew, Powidz and Słupca.

References
Polish official population figures 2006

Ostrowite
Słupca County